Ngaba is a municipality (commune) in the Mont Amba district of Kinshasa, the capital city of the Democratic Republic of the Congo.

It is situated in the south of Kinshasa. Settlement in this hilled area is relatively new.

References

See also 

Communes of Kinshasa
Mont Amba District